Marcel Granollers and Horacio Zeballos were the defending champions, but they decided not to participate this year.

Tomislav Brkić and Nikola Ćaćić won the title, defeating Ariel Behar and Gonzalo Escobar in the final, 6–3, 7–5.

Seeds

Draw

Draw

References 

 Main Draw

2021 ATP Tour
2021 Argentina Open – Doubles